David Michôd (born 30 November 1972) is an Australian film director, screenwriter, producer and actor. He is best known for directing the critically acclaimed crime drama Animal Kingdom (2010) and dystopian drama The Rover (2014). He also co-wrote Hesher (2010).

Education and early career
Michôd was educated at Sydney Grammar School before moving to Melbourne to study arts at the University of Melbourne. After working for the Victorian Department of Education he decided to attend film school while in his mid-20s. He was the editor of Inside Film magazine from 2003 to 2006.

Career

Early career: Short films and documentaries
Michôd began his directing career in short films, with Ezra White, LL.B. in 2006 being one of the first to make an impact. In 2007, Michôd's short film Crossbow, a coming-of-age drama was premiered at Venice Film Festival and received positive response from critics. Afterwards, the film competed at number of film festivals and earned good reviews. The film also screened at Sundance Film Festival and won the Australian Film Institute Award for Best Screenplay in a Short Film.

In 2008, Michôd directed another short film, Netherland Dwarf, which also screened at Sundance Film Festival and Berlin International Film Festival and earned positive reviews from critics. The same year, Michôd co-directed Solo, a documentary film with Jennifer Peedom. It depicts the fatal journey of Australian adventurer Andrew McAuley who went on a solo kayak crossing from Tasmania to New Zealand. The documentary received a positive response upon release, with Empire rating the film five stars: "As a tribute to a man – and man's – insatiable search for adventure, it's unforgettable." In 2009, Michôd directed Inside the Square, a 30-minute behind-the-scenes documentary on the making of 2008 film The Square directed by Nash Edgerton.

Feature films

Animal Kingdom
In 2010, he released his first feature film, Animal Kingdom. The film was widely acclaimed by critics and received several awards and nominations. Dave Calhoun from Time Out compared him to Martin Scorsese saying that "He brings a big dose of Scorsese to Melbourne in telling of a fictional crime family." J.R. Jones of Chicago Reader praised Michôd''s director saying "Writer-director David Michôd creates a densely textured moral universe that makes good on his metaphoric title." Bill Goodykoontz of The Arizona Republic said that "The naturalistic style Michôd employs adds to the sense of dread. Is there no way out of this existence?" The film became the third highest grossing Australian film at the Australian box office in 2010, with a worldwide box office gross of US$5,775,563.

The Rover
Michôd's next film, The Rover, was a futuristic Western starring Guy Pearce and Robert Pattinson. Filming began on 29 January 2013 in Southern Flinders Ranges in Australia and ended on 16 March 2013 in Marree, north of Adelaide. The film premiered out of competition in the Midnight Screenings section at the 2014 Cannes Film Festival on 18 May 2014. Todd McCarthy of The Hollywood Reporter said "David Michod’s follow-up to his internationally successful debut with the Melbourne gangster saga Animal Kingdom is equally murderous but more pared down to basics, as desperate men enact a survival-of-the-meanest scenario in an economically gutted world reduced to Old West outlaw behavior." The film had a limited release on 13 June 2014 in New York City and Los Angeles before expanding nationwide on 20 June 2014 in the United States.

War Machine
On 14 April 2014 it was announced that Michôd would write and direct The Operators, based on the 2011 best seller of the same name by Michael Hastings. The film will be jointly produced by Plan B Entertainment, New Regency and RatPac Entertainment, with Brad Pitt attached to star. It was later retitled War Machine. In March 2017, Netflix released a teaser trailer for the film in which Brad Pitt plays a thinly veiled version of Stanley A. McChrystal. Hastings also wrote the Rolling Stone article that revealed the friction between McChrystal's staff and then President Barack Obama's and which ultimately led to McChrystal losing his job. The film was released on Netflix on 26 May 2017 and was met with mixed reviews.

The King 
In an interview in 2013, it was revealed that Joel Edgerton and Michôd had co-written The King, an adaptation for Warner Bros. Pictures of three Shakespeare's plays : Henry IV, Part 1, Henry IV, Part 2, and Henry V. In February 2018, it was announced that Timothée Chalamet had been cast in the titular role, with Plan B Entertainment and Blue-Tongue Films, set to produce. Principal photography began on 1 June 2018 in London. The film premiered on Netflix on 1 November 2019.

Influences
In the 2012 Sight & Sound Poll of the greatest films of all time Michôd chose Apocalypse Now, Alien, The Assassination of Jesse James by the Coward Robert Ford, Funny Games, Magnolia, Network, Sunset Blvd., The Thin Red Line, Taxi Driver and Werckmeister Harmonies as his top ten picks.

Filmography

Film

Short films

Acting roles

Television

Acting roles

Recurring collaborators

This chart lists every actor who has appeared in more than one film directed by Michôd. Anthony Hayes, Joel Edgerton, and Mirrah Foulkes are Michôd's most frequent collaborators, with Hayes and Edgerton each having appeared in four and Foulkes in five of his films.

Awards

 David Michôd was honored along with Joel Edgerton and Teresa Palmer for their work in international roles with the coveted 2011 Australians in Film Breakthrough Award.

References

External links

IONCINEMA.com IonCinephile of the Month Profile
IONCINEMA.com David Michôd's Top Ten Films List
IONCINEMA.com interview with David Michôd for Animal Kingdom

Australian film directors
Australian male film actors
Living people
Australian screenwriters
Australian film producers
1972 births